Going South Shopping is a 1989 Spanish comedy film directed by Fernando Colomo based on the play Bajarse al moro José Luis Alonso de Santos. It Verónica Forqué alongside Antonio Banderas, Juan Echanove, and Aitana Sánchez-Gijón.

Plot 
The plot tracks the mishaps of Chusa (a drug trafficker 'going south' to Morocco to buy hashish) and other characters based in the neighborhood of Lavapiés, including her cousin Jaimito, police agent Alberto, and virgin Elena.

Cast

Production 
Based on José Luis Alonso de Santos's play Bajarse al moro, the screenplay was penned by Alonso de Santos alongside Fernando Colomo and Joaquín Oristrell. The film is an Ion Producciones and Lolafilms production. The score was composed by the sibling duo Pata Negra consisting of Rafael Amador and Raimundo Amador. Shooting locations included Madrid, Chaouen, and Algeciras. The dialogues incorporate elements of the cheli jargon characteristic of Madrid's outcast youth.

Release 
The film opened in theatres on 5 May 1989.

Accolades 

|-
| rowspan = "6" align = "center" | 1990 || rowspan = "6" | 4th Goya Awards || Best Adapted Screenplay || Fernando Colomo ||  || rowspan = "6" | 
|-
| Best Actress || Verónica Forqué || 
|-
| Best Supporting Actress || Chus Lampreave ||  
|-
| Best Original Score || Pata Negra || 
|-
| Best Production Supervision || Andrés Santana || 
|-
| Best Sound || Miguel Ángel Polo, Enrique Molinero || 
|}

See also 
 List of Spanish films of 1989

References

External links
 
 

Spanish comedy films
1989 films
1980s Spanish-language films
Films shot in Madrid
Films shot in Morocco
Films shot in the province of Cádiz
Films directed by Fernando Colomo
1989 comedy films
1980s Spanish films
LolaFilms films
Films set in Morocco
Films about drugs
Films set in Madrid